Vathikudy  is a Gram panchayat in Idukki district in the Indian state of Kerala.The main two town of VathikudyGram panchayat  is  Thopramkudy  and  Murickassery

Demographics
 India census, Vathikudy had a population of 32,518.
Vathikudy is a village notified in Gadgil committee report

Education
 Pavanatma College, Murickassery
 Mar Sleeva College, Rajamudy 
 Gov. Higher Secondary School, Thopramkudy
 Gov. Higher Secondary School, Pathinaramkandam
 St.Marys Higher Secondary school, Murickassery
 Depaul Public School, Rajamudy
 Marian Senior Secondary School, Marygiry
 Auxilium English Medium School Kanakakkunnu
 St.Maria gorethi LP School Thopramkudy
 Holyfamily U P School Kiliyarkandam, Thopramkudy
 Christhuraja LP School, Rajamudy
 S.H UP School, Padamugham
 St. Marys UP School Udayagiri, Thopramkudy
 St. Jacobs UP School Bathel, Thopramkudy

Health
 GOV PHC, Pathinaramkandam
 Alphonsa Hospital, Murickassery
 Velamkannimatha Hospital, Thopramkudy
 Amala Hospital, Thopramkudy
 Govt. Homeo Hospital Vathikkudy
 SH Clinic, Thopramkudy
 Our Family Clinic, Thopramkudy

Banking

 Federal Bank, Thopramkudy
 Union Bank Of India, Thopramkudy
 South Indian Bank, Murickassery
 Canara Bank, Murickassery
 I D C B Bank, Thopramkudy
 I D C B Bank, Murickassery
 Service Co operative Bank, Thopramkudy
 Service Co operative Bank, Murickassery
 Service Co operative Bank, Rajamudy
 Service Co operative Bank, Chembakappara
 Muthoot Fincorp Ltd, Thopramkudy
 Muthoot Fincorp Ltd, Murickassery
 Muthoot Finance, Murickassery
 Kosamattam Finance, Thopramkudy
 Kosamattam Finance, Murickassery

Others
 Sub- Registrar Office, Thopramkudy
 Sub - Treasury, Murickassery
 Village Office, Murickassery
 KSFE, Thopramkudy
 Govt.Veterinary Hospital, Murickassery
 Govt.Veterinary Hospital, Thopramkudy
 Police Station, Murickassery
 KrushiBhavan, Murickassery
 Panchayath Office, Murickassery
 KSEB Section Office, Murickassery
 Dairy Extension Office, Thopramkudy, 
 BSNL, Thopramkudy
 BSNL, Murickassery
 VFPCK, Thopramkudy

References

Villages in Idukki district